The 2015 Nigerian House of Representatives elections in Lagos State was held on March 28, 2015, to elect members of the House of Representatives to represent Lagos State, Nigeria.

Overview

Summary

Results

Agege 
APC candidate Taofeek Adaranijo Atunwa won the election, defeating other party candidates.

Ajeromi/Ifelodun 
PDP candidate Rita Orji won the election, defeating other party candidates.

Alimosho 
APC candidate Olufemi Adebanjo won the election, defeating other party candidates.

Amuwo Odofin 
PDP candidate Oghene Egoh won the election, defeating other party candidates.

Apapa 
APC candidate Ayodeji Joseph won the election, defeating other party candidates.

Badagry 
APC candidate Bamgbose Joseph won the election, defeating other party candidates.

Epe 
APC candidate Tasir Raji won the election, defeating other party candidates.

Eti-Osa 
APC candidate Babajide Hazeez won the election, defeating other party candidates.

Ibeju-Lekki 
APC candidate Abayomi Abdul-Kabir Ayeola won the election, defeating other party candidates.

Ifako/Ijaiye 
APC candidate Adewale Oluwatayo won the election, defeating other party candidates.

Ikeja 
APC candidate Abiodun Faleke won the election, defeating other party candidates.

Ikorodu 
APC candidate Babajimi Benson won the election, defeating other party candidates.

Kosofe 
APC candidate Agunsoye Oluwarotimi won the election, defeating other party candidates.

Lagos Island I 
APC candidate Enitan Badru won the election, defeating other party candidates.

Lagos Island II 
APC candidate Balogun Yakub Abiodun won the election, defeating other party candidates.

Lagos Mainland 
APC candidate Jimoh Abdul won the election, defeating other party candidates.

Mushin I 
A candidate Dauda Kako Are won the election, defeating other party candidates.

Mushin II 
APC candidate Bolaji Ayinla won the election, defeating other party candidates.

Ojo 
PDP candidate Tajudeen Obasa won the election, defeating other party candidates.

Oshodi/Isolo I 
PDP candidate Mutiu Shadimu won the election, defeating other party candidates.

Oshodi/Isolo II 
PDP candidate Tony Nwulu won the election, defeating other party candidates.

Shomolu 
APC candidate Oyewole Diya won the election, defeating other party candidates.

Surulere I 
APC candidate Femi Gbajabiamila won the election, defeating other party candidates.

Surulere II 
PDP candidate Olatunji Soyinka won the election, defeating other party candidates.

References 

Lagos State House of Representatives elections
Lagos State